SS Huntingdon was a refrigerated steam cargo liner that was built in Germany in 1920 as Münsterland. The United Kingdom took her as war reparations and sold her to the Federal Steam Navigation Company, who renamed her Huntingdon. She operated between Britain and Australasia until 1941, when an Italian submarine sank her in the Atlantic Ocean.

This was the first of two ships in the Federal Steam fleet to be called Huntingdon. The second was a motor ship that was built in Scotland in 1948, transferred to P&O in 1973 and scrapped in 1975.

Building
In 1917 Bremer Vulkan in Bremen-Vegesack built the refrigerated cargo liner Friesland. Bremer Vulkan then built her sister ships Sauerland in 1918, Wendland in 1919 and Münsterland in 1920.

Her holds had  of refrigerated cargo space.

Münsterland had two screws, each driven by a triple expansion engine. Between them her twin engines were rated at 1,115 NHP.

The UK Government seized Münsterland and her three sisters under Article 231 of the Treaty of Versailles. Münsterland was given the UK official number 145104 and code letters KGWL and registered in London. The Shipping Controller placed her under the management of Alfred McIntosh and Company of Leith.

Federal Steam fleet
Federal Steam operated a cargo liner service between New Zealand, Australia and the UK, bringing refrigerated produce to the UK and general cargo to Australia and New Zealand. The company lost three cargo ships to enemy action in the First World War.

The UK Government supplied Münsterland and her three sisters to Federal Steam as reparations. Federal Steam named its ships after English counties or county towns. Friesland became , Sauerland became Norfolk, Wendland became Cumberland and Münsterland became Huntingdon.

By 1931 Bremer Vulkan had supplied Huntingdon with a pair of Bauer-Wach exhaust turbines. Each turbine was powered by the exhaust steam from the low-pressure cylinder of one of her piston engines, and drove the same propeller shaft as that piston engine via a Föttinger fluid coupling. The turbines increased Huntingdons fuel efficiency, and raised her total power to 1,270 NHP.

In 1934 the call sign GJFZ replaced her code letters.

Second World War service
In the Second World War Huntingdon continued her regular trade between New Zealand, Australia and the UK. She sailed mostly unescorted, with convoy protection only in the North Atlantic. She used both the Cape of Good Hope route via South Africa and the trans-Pacific route via the Panama Canal.

Loss
On 19 February 1941 Huntingdon left the Firth of Clyde with Convoy OB 288. At 0235 hrs on 24 February the  hit Huntingdon with one torpedo, which blew a large hole in the port side of her number one hold. Her Master, Captain Styrin, ordered his crew to abandon ship. All the crew got safely away in the lifeboats, which then stood clear of the ship. It was snowing and bitterly cold.

Michele Bianchi fired a second torpedo, which hit Huntingdon at 0312 hrs. Huntingdon broke in two and sank in ten minutes. The  Greek cargo ship Papalemos rescued all 67 of her crew.

See also

References

Bibliography

1920 ships
Maritime incidents in February 1941
Ships built in Bremen (state)
Ships sunk with no fatalities
Ships sunk by Italian submarines
Steamships of the United Kingdom
Ships of the United Kingdom
World War II merchant ships of the United Kingdom
World War II shipwrecks in the Atlantic Ocean